Akka  (Elder Sister) is an Indian Tamil-language soap opera aired on Jaya TV. The show premiered on 15 September 2014 and aired Monday through Friday at 8:30PM IST. The series stars Kausalya, Nithya Das, Feroz Khan and Akhila. The show last aired on 9 April 2015 and ended with 143 episodes.

Plot
The plot consisted of Manimegalai searching for her lost sisters, and the serial ended with her death which brought her family back together again.

Cast
 Kausalya as Manimegalai 
 Nithya Das as Seetha
 Vadivukkarasi
 Rajesh
 Ferozkhan as Arun
 Chitra Lakshmanan
 Shyam Ganesh
 Akhila as Geetha
 Suhashini
 Manikandan

References

External links
official website 
Jaya TV on Youtube

Jaya TV television series
2014 Tamil-language television series debuts
2010s Tamil-language television series
Tamil-language television shows
2015 Tamil-language television series endings